The finals and the qualifying heats of the Women's 4×100 metres Medley Relay event at the 1997 FINA Short Course World Championships were held on the last day of the competition, on Sunday 20 April 1997 in Gothenburg, Sweden.

Finals

Qualifying heats

See also
1996 Women's Olympic Games 4x100m Medley Relay
1997 Women's European LC Championships 4x100m Medley Relay

References
 Results

R
1997 in women's swimming